Jasidih is a satellite town of Deoghar  in the Deoghar subdivision of the Deoghar district in the Indian state of Jharkhand. This town's railway station connects Deoghar to other cities.

Geography

Location
It has an average elevation of 260 metres (853 feet). Its nearby villages are Rohini, Kushmaha, Tabhaghat and others.

Overview
The map shows a large area, which is a plateau with low hills, except in the eastern portion where the Rajmahal hills intrude into this area and the Ramgarh hills are there.  The south-western portion is just a rolling upland. The entire area is overwhelmingly rural with only small pockets of urbanisation.

Note: The full screen map is interesting. All places marked on the map are linked in the full screen map and one can easily move on to another page of his/her choice. Enlarge the full screen map to see what else is there – one gets railway connections, many more road connections and so on.

Demographics
As of 15 September 2017 India census, Jasidih had a population of 14,129. Males constitute 60% of the population and females 40%. Jasidih has an average literacy rate of 71.5%, lower than the national average of 74.5%.In Jasidih, 20% of the population is below 20 years of age.

Transportation

Railway
 is located on the Howrah-Delhi main line. Jasidih was ranked as one of the cleanest railway station in India. It is well connected with foot over bridges and Google Wifi. There are frequent local trains from Jasidih to Deoghar. There also exists auto rickshaw and car service from Jasidih station.

Road
Jasidih is also well connected by road to neighbouring  including  , Dumka, Giridih, Godda Dhanbad, Jamui, Banka, and Bhagalpur.

Places of interest

Visitors' attractions

Taj Mahal painting
Gayatri Mandir
Rohini Park Rohini
River View
Haldigram
Digariya Pahad
Anukul Thakur Ashram Manikpur
Pagla Baba Mandir (Balanand Ashram)

Market
Jasidih has a good market area. This market serves as the destination for food and other goods for many tourist who visit Deoghar.

Institutions
Birla Institute Of Technology, Deoghar  is one of the extension centers of BIT Mesra, Ranchi and is located at Jasidih.

References

Cities and towns in Deoghar district
Hill stations in Jharkhand